Do It Now! (subtitled Worry 'Bout It Later) is the second album by American guitarist and keyboardist Clifford Coulter recorded in 1971 for the Impulse! label.

Reception
The Allmusic review awarded the album 3 stars.

Track listing
All compositions by Clifford Coulter except s indicated
 "Ridin' On Empty" (Gene Robert) - 4:27   
 "Yodelin' in the Whatchamaname Thang" - 6:40   
 "Do It Now" - 5:45   
 "Worry Later" - 3:23   
 "Mr. Peabody" - 3:56   
 "VJC" - 8:56   
 "Before the Morning Comes" (Robert) - 6:20  
Recorded at Western Recorders, Los Angeles, California on May 24 & 25, 1970 and at Wally Heider Sound Studios in San Francisco, California on September 28, 1971

Personnel
Clifford Coulter - piano, organ, electric piano, guitar, melodica, vocals, tambourine
Harry Edison - trumpet
John Turk - trumpet, varitone trumpet, cowbell
Jimmy Cleveland - trombone
Willie Ruff - french horn
Bill Perkins - alto saxophone
Marshal Royal - tenor saxophone
Plas Johnson - tenor saxophone, baritone saxophone
Mel Brown, Sonny Glaze, Ray MacCarty  - guitar
Jimmy Calhoun - electric bass
Ron Beck - drums, vocals
Cubby Ingram- Congas
Lucy Wilkins, Marlene Wilkins, Donnie Rogers, Shanne Coulter - vocals

References

Impulse! Records albums
Clifford Coulter albums
1972 albums
Albums recorded at Wally Heider Studios